Alexis Cossio Zamora (born 11 February 1995) is a Peruvian footballer who plays for Deportivo Municipal as a left back.

International career
Cossio was named in Peru's provisional squad for Copa América Centenario but was cut from the final squad.

Honours 
Sporting Cristal
Winner
 Peruvian Primera División: 2014

References

External links 
 
 

1995 births
Living people
Footballers from Lima
Peruvian footballers
Association football defenders
Peruvian Primera División players
Sporting Cristal footballers
Club Alianza Lima footballers
Real Garcilaso footballers
Ayacucho FC footballers
2015 South American Youth Football Championship players